Michael Lee Fowler is an American martial artist who is a Brazilian Jiu-Jitsu black belt. In addition to a number of major competitive achievements, Fowler is notable for the speed at which he attained the rank and is, according to some sources, the 3rd fastest American on record to do so. He is head instructor at North Shore Jiu Jitsu Club in Haleiwa, Hawaii.

Grappling career

Although coming to the art with a background in high school wrestling, Fowler did not begin formal grappling training until after high school in 2001, moving to Maryland to enter into Lloyd Irvin’s advanced grappling program. Fowler’s meteoric grappling career began shortly thereafter, winning numerous private tournaments such as Grapplers Quest and achieving a Pan-American championship as a blue belt. Many championships were to follow, with career highlights of 5 American National Championships and an Asian Open Championship in the black belt division.

He also teaches numerous grappling seminars across the US.

ADCC

In 2007, Fowler was invited to the ADCC Submission Wrestling World Championship, a prestigious Submission Grappling event where despite ultimately placing 4th overall, he defeated the legendary Renzo Gracie and Saulo Ribeiro, only losing to the equally elite Marcelo Garcia by guillotine and Andre Galvao by points.

References

External links
 Fowler's promotional blog
 "Interview:Mike Fowler" - BJJ Asia
 Mike Fowler Interview At NY Open 2010
 2014 interview with Mike Fowler

1983 births
Living people
American practitioners of Brazilian jiu-jitsu
People awarded a black belt in Brazilian jiu-jitsu